The 2009 WPS Bathurst 12 Hour was an endurance race for Group 3E Series Production Cars. It was the seventh running of the Bathurst 12 Hour, and the third since the races 2007 revival. 

The race was won by defending champions, Rod Salmon's TMR Australia car driven by Salmon, Damien White and new team member, Tony Longhurst in an upgraded Mitsubishi Lancer Evolution.

Class structure
The event was staged at the Mount Panorama Circuit, Bathurst, New South Wales, Australia on 22 February 2009 with cars competing in the following classes:
 Class A – High Performance Rear Wheel Drive
 Class B – High Performance Sports
 Class C – High Performance All Wheel Drive
 Class D – Hot Hatch Performance Cars
 Class E – Production Sedans
 Class F – Production Sports
 Class G – Micro Sedans and Hatches
 Class H – Eco Diesel/Hybrid 3.5 litre and Over 
 Class I – Eco Diesel/Hybrid Under 3.5 litre
 Class J – Sports Utility Vehicles & V8 Utes

Results

Statistics
 Pole Position – #96 Steve Owen – 2:28.8838
 Fastest Lap – #55 Tony Ricciardello – 2:29.9865
 Average Speed – 124km/h

References

External links
Official website
Official timing and results
Images from the 2009 WPS Bathurst 12 Hour Retrieved from www.trentwallis.com on 25 March 2009

Motorsport in Bathurst, New South Wales
WPS Bathurst 12 Hour
February 2009 sports events in Australia